Patrick may refer to:

Patrick (given name), list of people and fictional characters with this name
Patrick (surname), list of people with this name

People

Saint Patrick (c. 385–c. 461), Christian saint
Gilla Pátraic (died 1084), Patrick or Patricius, Bishop of Dublin
Patrick, 1st Earl of Salisbury (c. 1122–1168), Anglo-Norman nobleman
Patrick (footballer, born 1983), Brazilian right-back
Patrick (footballer, born 1985), Brazilian striker
Patrick (footballer, born 1992), Brazilian midfielder
Patrick (footballer, born 1994), Brazilian right-back
Patrick (footballer, born May 1998), Brazilian forward
Patrick (footballer, born November 1998), Brazilian attacking midfielder
Patrick (footballer, born 1999), Brazilian defender
Patrick (footballer, born 2000), Brazilian defender
John Byrne (Scottish playwright) (born 1940), also a painter under the pseudonym Patrick
Don Harris (wrestler) (born 1960), American professional wrestler who uses the ring name Patrick

Multimedia

Films
Patrick (1978 film), an Australian horror film
Patrick (2013 film), an Australian remake of the 1978 film
Patrick (2018 film), a British comedy film
Patrick (2019 film), a Belgian comedy-drama film

TV Shows
The Patrick Star Show, American animated television series that is a spin-off of the famous animated television series SpongeBob SquarePants

Places
Patrick, Queensland, Barcaldine Region, Queensland, Australia
Patrick (parish), Isle of Man, UK
Patrick, South Carolina, US
Patrick County, Virginia, US

Organisations
Patrick (sportswear company), founded in 1892
Patrick Corporation, an Australian transport company
Patrick Division, a former division in the NHL

See also 
 Croagh Patrick, a mountain in the west of Ireland
 Patric (disambiguation)
 Partick (disambiguation)

ja:パトリック